The University Auditorium, originally known as the Memorial Auditorium and sometimes called the University of Florida Auditorium, is a historic building on the campus of the University of Florida in Gainesville, Florida, in the United States.
It was designed by William Augustus Edwards in the Collegiate Gothic style and was built between 1922-1924.<ref>McCarthy, Kevin M., and Laurie, Murray D., Guide to the University of Florida and Gainesville, 1977, Sarasota: Pineapple Press, pp. 136-137</ref> It was restored and expanded in 1977 by architect James McGinley. The expansion, which added a new entrance and lobbies, was designed to complement but not match the original architecture. It is a contributing property in the University of Florida Campus Historic District which was added to the National Register of Historic Places on April 20, 1989. On April 18, 2012, the AIA's Florida Chapter placed University Auditorium on its list of Florida Architecture: 100 Years. 100 Places.

Interior Design
William Edward's University Chapel-Auditorium was planned in the early 1920s to be the first unit of an imposing central University administrative building with a massive bell tower.  His design is clearly patterned after London's 11th-century Westminster Hall and 19th-century Central Lobby in the Houses of Parliament, and also appropriates some features seen in Proctor Hall, the 1913 graduate dining hall at Princeton University designed by Ralph Adams Cram.  The striking auditorium interior is unique in its application of a 14th-century hammerbeam roof to a cruciform structure.  The boss at each hammerbeam end presents one symbol of the "land-grant quadrivium" - the Scholar wears a four-cornered academic cap reminiscent of a 5th-century square biretta; the Musician strokes a Greek lyre; the Engineer lifts a notched gear; and the Athlete sports a leather football helmet.  In each of the two large windows above the east and west transept balconies, six scholars depicted in early 20th-century Art Deco style overlook the audience space.

Andrew Anderson Memorial Organ
University President Albert Murphree received $50,000 for the organ from Dr. Andrew Anderson, a St. Augustine physician, philanthropist, and associate of early Florida developer Henry Flagler.  The spacious interior of the University Auditorium with its elaborate wood-carvings and roomy galleries was reminiscent of Proctor Hall and other buildings at Princeton University (which Dr. Anderson had attended before the Civil War), and offered a congenial home.  Tonal plans for Florida were prepared by William Zeuch of Boston's famous Skinner Organ Company, which built and installed the original instrument in early 1925.  The organ was first played publicly on June 7, 1925, at the annual University Commencement Convocation.  A musical landmark for its day, the organ was designed and voiced at the zenith of orchestral-imitative or "symphonic" organ design in this country, and is mentioned in such reference works as Orpha Ochse's The History of the Organ in the United States and Charles Callahan's The American Classic Organ''.  It was heard frequently through the 1930s in recitals by Claude Murphree, University Organist, as well as in early broadcasts over the University's "new" radio station, WRUF.  An elaborate organ façade was also designed by the architect, but was never built.

In the early 1960s the Æolian-Skinner Organ Company of Boston began a program of mechanical renovation and tonal changes, and the M. P. Moller Organ Company continued expanding and modifying the organ as a teaching and recital instrument for the growing School of Music.  Only a handful of Skinner stops remain in the present instrument, with the majority coming from Æolian-Skinner, Moller, Austin and Reuter.  Today the Andrew Anderson Memorial Organ, with 99 ranks and nearly 5400 pipes,  is one of the largest recital instruments in the United States, with a major place in the musical life of this community of scholars.

Current use

The University of Florida Auditorium today is a performing arts venue which seats up to 843 people.  It has a concert stage, and is used for musical concerts, lectures, convocations, and pageants. Its director is Brian Jose.

See also
University of Florida
Buildings at the University of Florida
Campus Historic District

References

External links
 UF Historic Sites Guide: University Auditorium
 UF Performing Arts: University Auditorium
 Gainesville Sun article about the auditorium

Buildings at the University of Florida
William Augustus Edwards buildings
Historic district contributing properties in Florida
National Register of Historic Places in Gainesville, Florida
University and college buildings on the National Register of Historic Places in Florida
1924 establishments in Florida
University and college buildings completed in 1924